The arm and hammer is a symbol consisting of a muscular arm holding a hammer.  Used in ancient times as a symbol of the god Vulcan, it came to be known as a symbol of industry, for example blacksmithing and gold-beating. It has been used as a symbol by many different kinds of organizations, including banks, local government, and socialist political parties.

It has been used in heraldry, appearing in the Coat of arms of Birmingham and Seal of Wisconsin.

The similarity to the name of the industrialist Armand Hammer is not a coincidence: he was named after the symbol, as his father Julius Hammer was a supporter of socialist causes, including the Socialist Labor Party of America, with its arm-and-hammer logo.

The Arm & Hammer brand is a registered trademark of Church & Dwight, an American manufacturer of household products. According to the company, the logo originally represented Vulcan.  Armand Hammer made an offer to outright purchase this company having this brand with the similarity to his name, and while this offer was refused, he eventually acquired enough stock to have a controlling interest and join the board of directors.  He remained an owner until his death in 1990.

An arm-and-hammer sign can be seen in Manette Street, Soho, symbolizing the trade of gold-beating carried on there in the nineteenth century. It is referred to by Charles Dickens in A Tale of Two Cities. As of 2016, the sign there is a replica, with the original being held in the Dickens Museum.

One of the oldest visualizations of arm and hammer can be found on Svetitskhoveli Cathedral. It was completed in 1029 by the medieval Georgian architect Arsukidze, although the site itself dates back to the early fourth century.

Gallery

See also
Hammer and pick
Hammer and sickle
Fist and rose
Armand Hammer
We Can Do It!

References

External links 
 

Symbols
Heraldic charges
Symbols of communism
Visual motifs